Nathan Gibbs (born 22 December 1959) is an Australian sports physician and former professional rugby league footballer. He played for the South Sydney Rabbitohs and Parramatta Eels in the New South Wales Rugby League (NSWRL) competition.

Early life and sports career
Gibbs was a South Sydney junior but was graded by Eastern Suburbs during his final year at school. He returned to South Sydney and made his first-grade debut in 1978. Gibbs went on to captain the club and was the Dally M Second Rower of the Year in 1980.

Medical career
During the 1990s, he was team doctor for Manly Warringah, New South Wales and the Australian Kangaroos. In 1990, it was Gibbs that made the decision, controversial at the time, to rule Wally Lewis unfit to play for the Kangaroos. Following the appointment of Chris Anderson as coach of the Kangaroos in 1999, Gibbs was replaced by then Canterbury doctor, Hugh Hazard.

Gibbs continues to work in the rugby league arena and was also club doctor for the Sydney Swans where he was appointed Life Membership on 1 October 2010. He was one of the inaugural Fellows of the Australasian College of Sport and Exercise Physicians.

References

External links
Nathan Gibbs at Yesterday's Hero

1959 births
Living people
20th-century Australian medical doctors
21st-century Australian medical doctors
Australian rugby league players
Australian sports physicians
Parramatta Eels players
Rugby league second-rows
Rugby league locks
Place of birth missing (living people)
South Sydney Rabbitohs captains
South Sydney Rabbitohs players
University of New South Wales Medical School alumni
University of Sydney alumni